James M. Hill Memorial High School is one of two public, English language high schools in the city of Miramichi, New Brunswick, Canada. It serves principally students from the south side of the Miramichi River, from the smaller communities of Chatham, Loggieville, Chatham Head, Nelson, Barnaby River, and Napan.  It is named in honour of the Reverend James M. Hill.

Notable alumni
 Jason Dickson, Former MLB player (Anaheim Angels)

Sports Teams
 Men's and women's basketball, volleyball, hockey, rugby, track and field, cross country and soccer are offered at the school. Women's field hockey and men's football are also offered.

See also
 Anglophone North School District

References

External links
 James M. Hill Memorial High School

Schools in Miramichi, New Brunswick